Bijar Boneh (also Romanized as Bījār Boneh) is a village in Howmeh Rural District, in the Central District of Rasht County, Gilan Province, Iran. At the 2006 census, its population was 1,359, in 402 families.

References 

Populated places in Rasht County